NSMM may stand for:

 National Science and Media Museum, museum in Bradford, England
 National Society of Metal Mechanics, former British trade union